HCRD may stand for:

 Harm City Roller Derby, a men's roller derby league based in Baltimore
 Harbor City Roller Dames, a women's roller derby league based in Duluth, Minnesota
 Hillcrest Research and Development, a small tech company based in Windham, Maine